Martin Paul Johns (born 5 July 1969) is a New Zealand middle-distance runner.

Johns was born in 1969 in Wellington. He ran in the men's 1,500 metres at the 1996 Summer Olympics with a time of 3:44.91, but did not advance.

References

Athletes at the Games by John Clark, page 170 (1998, Athletics New Zealand)   
Profile at NZOGC website

Athletes (track and field) at the 1996 Summer Olympics
Living people
New Zealand male middle-distance runners
Olympic athletes of New Zealand
1969 births